Murony is a village in Békés County, in the Southern Great Plain region of south-east Hungary.
In 1950 it became a completely independent village.

Geography
It covers an area of 35.68 km² and has a population of 1200 people (2015).

References

Populated places in Békés County